Tabula Rasa was a major progressive rock group from Finland founded in 1972, however the band split up in 1977.

History 

The original members were Heikki Silvennoinen, Asko Pakkanen, and Tapio Suominen. British rock band Cream might have been their biggest source of inspiration though they followed contemporary trends of prog-rock. Jethro Tull and King Crimson were direct progressive rock influences from the United Kingdom.

In 1975, under the record label Love Records, they published their first album "Tabula Rasa" as well as single "Prinssi/Lähtö".

The debut album has been pretty well regarded though Mikko Alatalo's political lyrics have been somewhat controversial. The band was closely associated to this rock singer who wrote lyrics for them and for whom they also worked as backing musicians (Alatalo's gigs brought them more money than playing their own music). Silvennoinen composed most of songs.

They made their second and last album "Ekkedien Tanssi" in 1976.

The band disbanded in 1977. Heikki Silvennoinen and drummer Jukka Aronen left the group due to the fading popularity of prog-rock. Some members also had become religious which decreased their interest in the band.

Members 

The line-up of the band was as follows:

 Guitar - Heikki Silvennoinen
 Drums - Asko Pakkanen and Jukka-Petteri Aronen
 Bass - Tapio Suominen
 Vocals - Jukka Leppilampi and Jukka Salmela 
 Flute - Jarmo Sormunen
 Piano - Jarno Sinisalo

Discography 

Studio albums

 Tabula Rasa (1975)
 Ekkedien Tanssi (1976)

References 

Finnish progressive rock groups
Musical groups established in 1972